Masters Performing Arts College is an independent dance/musical theatre college based in the town of Rayleigh in Essex, England.

Training
Key areas of study include ballet, tap dance, jazz and contemporary dance, singing, and drama.

The college offer one course:
Professional 3 Year Diploma in Musical Theatre/Dance

The college course is accredited by the Council for Dance Education and Training.

The college offer its own scholarship/funding awards.

The college has over 100 students.

The college is also an approved centre of the Imperial Society of Teachers of Dancing. Students have the opportunity to gain nationally recognised dance teaching qualifications with the organisation, in ballet, tap and modern theatre dance.

The college stages an annual production in July at The Shaw Theatre - London to showcase work across all 3 years. This is attended by industry and parents / guardians.

The college also stages a Year 3 - Graduate Year Showcase at The Leicester Square Theatre in May each year which many agents/directors in the industry attend in helping the graduates gain agent representation & employment.

Notable alumni
Nathalie Emmanuel- Sasha Valentine- Hollyoaks- Channel 4
Clare Foster- Millie Brown- The Bill- ITV (Currently playing the lead role of Polly Barker in the West End revival of Crazy For You)
Katie Collins- Top Commercial Dancer- T.V. & Arena tours (Leona Lewis 'Labyrinth Tour' 2010)
Anthony Whiteman- Dance Captain- Billy Elliot the Musical- West End

 

Schools of the performing arts in the United Kingdom
Drama schools in the United Kingdom
Dance schools in the United Kingdom
Rayleigh, Essex
1995 establishments in England
Educational institutions established in 1995